Doot-Doot is the debut studio album by Welsh new wave and synth-pop band Freur, released in 1983 by CBS Records. The cassette version of the album included four extra tracks. The lead single, "Doot-Doot", peaked at No. 59 on the UK Singles Chart and No. 17 in New Zealand. The song "Doot-Doot" has appeared in several films, including Let Me In (2010) and Vanilla Sky (2001).

CD release
The album was unavailable on CD until it was reissued by Oglio Records in 1993 in the United States. The album has since been reissued twice in the United Kingdom, in 2000 by Columbia Records and subsequently in 2009 by Cherry Red Records as Get Us out of Here/Doot-Doot – which includes both Freur albums on one CD.

Track listing
All songs written and composed by Karl Hyde, Rick Smith and Alfie Thomas.

CBS Records LP: CBS 25522-1

CBS Records Cassette: CBS 40-25522

1993 – Oglio Records CD: OGL 81566-2

2000 – Columbia Records CD: 498247 2

2009 – Cherry Red Records CD: CDM RED 419*

* Tracks 1–10 taken from the album Get Us out of Here (1986).

Personnel
Credits are adapted from the Doot-Doot liner notes.

Additional musicians
 Andy Sheppard – soprano saxophone and tenor saxophone on "Runaway"
 Pino Palladino – fretless bass and Chapman Stick on "Theme from the Film of the Same Name"

Production and artwork
 Freur and John Hudson – producer
 Freur and Alex Burak – producer "Doot-Doot"
 Freur – producer "Hold Me Mother"
 John Hudson – engineer
 Pat Stapley and John Hudson – engineer "Runaway"
 John Hudson and John Etchells – engineer "Tender Surrender" and "Steam Machine"
 Simon Smart and John Hudson – engineer "Matters of the Heart"
 John Hudson and Rob Parr – engineer "Hold Me Mother"
 Pete Suthers – electronic research development
 Recorded at Point Studios, Ridge Farm, Jam, Abbey Road and Mayfair
 Mixed at Mayfair
 Brian Griffin – front cover/inner sleeve photographs
 Simon Fowler – group photograph

References

External links

1983 debut albums
CBS Records albums
Freur albums